Diana Balmori Ling (June 4, 1932 – November 14, 2016) was a landscape and urban designer. She was the founder of the landscape design firm Balmori Associates.

Early life and education 
Born in Gijón, Spain, Diana Balmori spent most of her childhood in Spain and England before her family settled in Argentina. Her mother Dorothy Ling (born in England) was a musician and musicologist. Her father Clemente Hernando Balmori (born in Spain) was a linguistic expert. At an early age Balmori learned to sing, dance, play piano, and her parents encouraged her to explore a wide range of mediums. She brought many of these influences with her into the design world.

She graduated from high school at the age of 16 and studied at the Architecture School at the National University of Tucumán in Argentina, in the undergraduate program. It was there she met her future husband, César Pelli, and the two of them emigrated to the United States in 1952. Balmori continued her education at the University of California, Los Angeles, earning her PhD in urban history. Balmori and Pelli had two children: Denis, a neurobiologist and professor of psychology and neural science at New York University and Rafael Pelli, who went on to become a well-known architect at his father's firm, Cear Pelli Associates. The couple resided in an apartment in the San Remo on Manhattan's Upper West Side.

Career 
After graduation, she moved to the East Coast to start her professional and academic work. Balmori accepted a teaching position at the State University of New York at Oswego and held undergraduate seminars in Landscape History at Yale School of Architecture. Balmori continued her own education, studying landscape architecture at Radcliffe College, until she was made partner at Cesar Pelli Associates, where she also founded their in-house Landscape Architecture department. She continued to work as a partner at CPA before leaving in 1990 to start her own firm, Balmori Associates.

As the principal landscape designer at Balmori Associates, she was the lead on many innovative projects. She designed the Master Plan for the Abandiobarra District in Bilbao, Spain, where her landscape designs run alongside the Nervion River and adjacent to the building of the Guggenheim Bilbao. She realized the concept of Robert Smithson for a floating island around New York City in 2005. Out of 36 submissions from 9 countries, Balmori Associates (New York) with StudioMDA, Knippers Helbig Inc., David Skelly, CITA, Bluegreen, John A. Martin & Associates, and David Langdon, was selected as one of five finalists in the ARC International Wildlife Crossing Infrastructure Design Competition, a competition sponsored by ARC Solutions, which challenged competitors to propose design concepts for a wildlife crossing over US Interstate 70 (I-70), near Denver, Colorado.

Besides an extensive list of built works during her career, Balmori also influenced public and national policy on the built environment. Her positions included: a member of the Allston Development Group at Harvard University, a member of the Board of The Van Alen Institute, the Lower Manhattan Development Corporation for the World Trade Center Site, and as a Committee Member for the Comprehensive Design Plan for the White House. Balmori was honored by institutions including the National Endowment for the Arts, the National Endowment for the Humanities and the American Institute of Architects. In 2006, Balmori was appointed a Senior Fellow in Garden and Landscape Studies at Dumbarton Oaks in Washington, DC.; she served two terms on the U.S. Commission of Fine Arts. Balmori held the Davenport Chair of Architectural Design for the Spring 2004 at the Yale School of Architecture and was the William Henry Bishop Visiting Professor of Architectural Design in the Fall 2008 at the Yale School of Architecture and she also taught in the Yale School of Forestry and Environmental Studies. She was a member of the American Historical Association, and the American Society of Landscape Architects. She served as a Committee Member for the Comprehensive Design Landscape Plan for the White House in 1999.

Balmori wrote on cities, environment, and the history of design. She linked her practice with foundations and academic institutions.

She contributed to numerous publications, including coauthoring the books Beatrix Farrand, American Landscapes: Garden and Campus Designs(1985), Redesigning the American Lawn (1993) and Groundwork: Between Landscape and Architecture (2011).

In 2011 she was named a fellow of the American Society of American Landscape Architects.

In 2014, Balmori's firm, Balmori Associates, moved into a new space in Soho, New York City. Balmori lived and worked in New York City.

She died in her sleep on November 14, 2016, at the age of 84.

Style
Balmori's interest in landscape and urban design grew out of her interest in public space; the way it is used and designed, and its role and effect on the larger environment. Her design style is recognized by the way it creates a fluid interface between landscape and structure in the development of urban public spaces. The work explores how form can respond to a new understanding of nature – not simply as visual imitation – but contingent on an understanding of process.

She was also an innovator in sustainable systems; one aspect of this is in the area of green roofs. Balmori called the huge expanse of urban rooftops the "fifth façade.”

Balmori frequently collaborated with artists and architects.

Notable works 

 Smithson Floating Island, New York, NY, US (2005) with Robert Smithson
 Abandiobarra Masterplan, Bilbao, Spain (2012)
 Masterplan for New Government City of Sejong, South Korea (2014)
 GROWONUS, Brooklyn, NY, US (2015)
Battery Park City
Ronald Reagan Washington National Airport

Selected bibliography 

 "Drawing and Reinventing Landscape": Wiley, (United Kingdom) 2014
 "A Landscape Manifesto": Yale University Press, (United States) 2010
 "Tra Fiume e Cittá Paesaggi, Progetti e Principi": Bollati Boringhieri, (Italy) 2009
 "Balmori": C3 Publications, (Korea) 2007
 "The Land and Natural Development (LAND) Code, Guidelines for Sustainable Land Development" co-authored with Gaboury Benoit: John Wiley and Sons Ltd. (United States) 2006
 "Mapping in The Age of Digital Media: The Yale Symposium" co-authored with M. Silver: John Wiley and Sons Ltd. (United Kingdom) 2003
 "Information Exchange: How Cities Renew, Rebuild and Remember" Interview with Joan Oakman and Paulsen Sherida: Van Alen Institute, (United States) 2003
 "Saarinen House and Garden: A Total Work of Art" co-authored with Roy Slade, and Gregory Wittkopp, photography by Balthazar Korab: Harry N. Abrams, (United States) 1995
 "Transitory Gardens, Uprooted Lives" co-authored with Margaret Morton: Yale University Press, (United States) 1995
 "Redesigning the American Lawn"A Search for Environmental Harmony co-authored with F. Herbert Bormann and GordoGeballe: Yale University Press, (United States) 1993
 "Trails for the Twenty-First Century: Planning, Design, and Management Manual for Multi-Use Trail," co-authored with Charles A. Flink, Peter Lagerwey, and Robert M.Searns, ed. Karen-Lee Ryan National Rails-to-Trails Conservancy: Island Press, (United States) 1993
 "Beatrix Farrand, American Landscapes:Garden and Campus Designs" co-authored with Diane McGuire and Eleanor McPeck: Sagapress, (United States) 1985

References

Further reading
 Ivy, Robert. "Editorial: Beyond Legalisms". Architectural Record November 2007 Beyond Legalisms
 Sokol, David. "Asian Cities Go Green". BusinessWeekNovember 2007 Asian Cities Go Green
 "Campa de los Ingleses". Europaconcorsi
 Usborne, David. "Perfect Company". Monocale July 2007: 84–88.
 Merkel, Jane. "Urban American Landscape" AD March–April 2007: 36–47.
 Kim, JinOh. "Principal of Balmori Associates: Diana Balmori" ela March 2007: 114–116.
 JooEun, YeeOh. "International Competition for the Master Plan of Public Administration Town". C3 March 2007: 136–145
 Chamberlain, Lisa. "View from the Bridge". Metropolis Magazine September 2006: 97–101.
 Chamberlain, Lisa. "Silvercup Sprouts". Polis. July 2006
 Martineau, Kim. "Activists Blaze Trail Through Yale". Hartford Courant. February 5, 2006.
 Lockhart. "Coming to the East 40's: Ground Zero". Curbed. November 10, 2005.
 Williams, Sam. "Cool(er) Roofs". Gotham Gazette. October 2005
 Moore, Bob. St. Louis Front Page "St. Louis Riverfront Plan – If You Dream It, Can You Build It?"
 Kennedy, Randy. "It's Not Easy Making Art That Floats". The New York Times. August 10, 2005.
 Chamberlain, Lisa. "A Roof Garden? It's Much More Than That". The New York Times. August 10, 2005.
 Chamberlain, Lisa. "Green roofs sprouting across U.S. skylines". International Herald Tribune. August 2005.

1932 births
2016 deaths
People from Gijón
American landscape and garden designers
American landscape architects
Women landscape architects
American women architects
American urban planners
Women urban planners
American garden writers
American architecture writers
University of California, Los Angeles alumni
Radcliffe College alumni
Harvard University staff
Spanish emigrants to Argentina
Argentine emigrants to the United States
21st-century American women